Mauro Pezzente is a Canadian musician. He is best known as being co-founder of Godspeed You! Black Emperor.

Pezzente, along with Efrim Menuck and Mike Moya, founded Godspeed You! Black Emperor in 1994. Along with Thierry Amar, Pezzente plays the bass guitar for the band.

Pezzente was the first to live and perform within the Hotel2Tango. Christening it the Gallery Quiva, Pezzente and his partner Kiva Stimac played infrequent shows there until exhaust and carbon monoxide from the garage below the loft caused them to move out. Efrim Menuck soon moved in and renamed it.

Maica Mia
Along with guitarist and vocalist Maica Armata (née Armata-Machnik) and her partner Jonny Paradise, Pezzente has played with the Montreal band Maica Mia.

References

External links
 – official site

Canadian rock bass guitarists
Godspeed You! Black Emperor members
Living people
Musicians from Montreal
Year of birth missing (living people)